Luis Aragonés Suárez (28 July 1938 – 1 February 2014) was a Spanish football player and manager. 

Aragonés spent the majority of his career as a player and coach at Atlético Madrid. He was a prominent player and then coach of the successful Atlético team of the late 1960s and early 1970s. The team were national champions four times, reached the 1974 European Cup Final. Between 1964 and 1974, he played 265 Primera Liga games for Atlético and scored 123 goals. He also played for several other clubs, including Real Madrid, and played 11 times for Spain, scoring three goals.

Apart from Atlético he also coached seven other La Liga clubs as well as the Spain national team, whom he led to their second European Championship title in 2008. He then became the head coach of the Turkish club Fenerbahçe after the tournament, the only time he coached outside his native Spain.

Playing career

Early career
Aragonés began his playing career with Getafe Deportivo in 1957. In 1958, he signed for Real Madrid but never made it into the senior team. He spent most of his time at Real Madrid on loan to other clubs, including Recreativo de Huelva and Hércules and playing for AD Plus Ultra, the Real Madrid reserve team. In 1960, he joined Real Oviedo and made his debut in the Primera División. Between 1961 and 1964, he played for Real Betis, making 86 league appearances and scoring 33 goals.

Atlético Madrid
In 1964, Aragonés was signed by Atlético Madrid where he acquired the nickname "Zapatones", meaning "big boots", since he was known as a free kick specialist. Aragonés picked up silverware in his first season at the club, winning the Copa del Rey (then known as the Copa del Generalísimo). He then helped Atlético to the La Liga title in 1965–66 and again in 1969–70, where he shared the Pichichi trophy for the highest scorer in the league with his fellow Atlético forward José Eulogio Gárate and Real Madrid's Amancio. A second Copa followed in 1973 and the team achieved a third league title in 1973–74. The following year, Atlético reached the final of the European Cup played against German champions Bayern Munich. During the match, Aragonés scored a goal late in extra time to give Atlético a 1–0 lead. A 119th-minute equaliser from Georg Schwarzenbeck, however, sent the final to a replay, where Bayern prevailed with a convincing 4–0 victory. His retirement followed soon after and he was appointed Atlético coach for the first time in the same year. To date, Aragonés remains Atlético's all-time top goalscorer and is ninth in the club's all-time appearance list.

International
Aragonés made his international debut for Spain on 8 May 1965 in a 0–0 friendly draw away to Scotland. The first of his three goals for Spain was in a friendly against France in Lyon, in a 3–1 win on his seventh cap on 17 October 1968. He captained the side for the sole time on his 10th of 11 caps, a 3–0 win over Northern Ireland in Seville on 11 November 1970 in qualification for UEFA Euro 1972. He scored in the match.

Managerial career

Spanish clubs

In his first season in charge at Atlético Madrid, Aragonés led Atlético to success over two legs in the 1974 Intercontinental Cup, where the team beat Copa Libertadores winners Independiente of Argentina 2–1 on aggregate. Atlético went on to claim the Copa del Generalísimo and La Liga title in 1976 and 1977 respectively.

After six years in charge of Atlético, Aragonés took over at Real Betis in 1981. His time in Andalusia, however, was brief and he returned to the Vicente Calderón in 1982. In his second spell at the club, his Atlético side came close to achieving a historic double during the 1984–85 season, winning the Copa del Rey and finishing runner-up in La Liga. The following season, the team reached the final of the European Cup Winners' Cup, where it was beaten 3–0 by Dynamo Kyiv.

Aragonés' success saw him appointed as manager of Barcelona in 1987, where he spent one season, winning the Copa del Rey. He then spent a season at fellow Barcelona based club Espanyol before rejoining Atlético for a third spell, where he won the sixth Copa del Rey of his career in 1992.

After leaving the club for a third time in 1993, he went on to coach Sevilla, Valencia, Real Betis, Real Oviedo and Mallorca. His biggest success during this period was in the 1995-96 season coming within four points of winning the La Liga title with Valencia.

In 2001, with the club in the Segunda División, Aragonés took over at Atlético for a fourth time and led the team to promotion back to the Primera División as champions in the 2001–02 season. He left the club for the final time in 2003 and remains its most successful manager with eight trophies won.

Aragonés returned to Mallorca on 2 October of the 2003–04 season, after the dismissal of Jaime Pacheco for a poor start to the season. He steered the club to 11th by the end of the season. On 1 July 2004, he took the job of Spain national team after Iñaki Sáez resigned due to public disapproval for failing to qualify the team from the group stage at UEFA Euro 2004.

Spain national football team

On taking over the national team following the UEFA Euro 2004 humiliation, Aragonés made changes to the team, dropping experienced players such as Míchel Salgado and Raúl and revamped with some new blood. Spain were unbeaten in qualification for the 2006 FIFA World Cup under Aragonés, but finished as group runner-up to Serbia and Montenegro, and thus required a play-off against Slovakia to secure their place. Spain won the play-off 6–2 on aggregate, with Luis García scoring a hat-trick in the first-leg 5–1 win. At the finals, Spain won all three group games before facing France in the Second Round. After taking the lead through David Villa, they lost 3–1 following goals from Franck Ribéry, Patrick Vieira and Zinedine Zidane. Realizing the physical weakness of Spanish players, he employed tiki-taka, a system of short passing which subsequently would also be identified with the playing style of Barcelona, and became the biggest football revolution in the history of Spanish football.

Aragonés stayed on as manager and presided over the following qualifications for the European Championship. The initial phase of the qualifiers started on a poor note with a 3–2 defeat to Northern Ireland and a 2–0 defeat to Sweden both away from home, a pair of results that put tremendous pressure on Aragonés' position. Spain recovered strongly to seal a ticket as group winners ahead of Sweden that also qualified directly to the tournament, while Denmark missed out.

Aragonés then presided over Spain's victorious campaign at Euro 2008, beating Germany 1–0 in the final with a goal from Fernando Torres for their first international honour since 1964. Aragonés had a superstitious fear of the colour yellow, and referred to Spain's change kit for the semi-final match against Russia as "mustard" and not "yellow".

His tiki-taka style of play was retained by his successor, Vicente del Bosque, who led Spain to further tournament victories.

Fenerbahçe
After denying an approach in late June, Aragonés replaced Zico as manager of Turkish Süper Lig club Fenerbahçe on 5 July 2008. He signed a two-year deal and declared his intention to win the league title in his first season. The club, however, finished in fourth, and he was dismissed on 2 June 2009 after the season had ended.

Managerial statistics

Honours

Player
Atlético Madrid 
La Liga: 1965–66, 1969–70, 1972–73
Copa del Rey: 1964–65, 1971–72
European Cup runner-up: 1974

Individual
Pichichi Trophy: 1969–70
Atlético Madrid's all-time leading top scorer: 172 goals

Manager
Atlético Madrid
La Liga: 1976–77
Copa del Rey: 1975–76, 1984–85, 1991–92
Supercopa de España: 1985
Segunda División: 2001–02
Intercontinental Cup: 1974

Barcelona
Copa del Rey: 1987–88

Spain 
UEFA European Championship: 2008

Individual
Don Balón Award (Best Coach): 1976–77
Marca Leyenda: 2008
IFFHS World's Best National Coach: 2008
Gold Medal of the Community of Madrid: 2014

Thierry Henry controversy
In 2004, Aragonés was appointed coach of Spain. During a training session in the same year, a Spanish TV crew filmed Aragonés making offensive comments to José Antonio Reyes about Reyes' black Arsenal teammate Thierry Henry, saying:

 
The incident caused uproar in the English media with calls for Aragonés to be sacked or suspended of his duties, however the Spanish Football Federation stated that "his offence has not been deemed serious enough to warrant a suspension of his duties, or his sacking"  After an investigation into the events during the match, UEFA fined the Royal Spanish Football Federation 100,000 Swiss francs/US$87,000 and warned that any future incidents would be punished more severely. UEFA noted that possible punishments could include suspension from major international tournaments or the closure of Spain's home international matches to supporters.

In response to this, Aragonés said in public that he was not a racist, and claimed that he had black friends. Brazilian-born black midfielder Marcos Senna stated:

Aragonés also responded to the controversy by saying to a group of reporters: "You are like wolves after the deer. You are kids. You don't know anything, but I am nearly 70. I have a lot of black friends who have explained to me that the English were after them in the colonies." These comments were criticised by Bobby Barnes, a member of the Professional Footballers' Association's executive and a trustee of the football anti-racism organisation Kick It Out, who suggested that Aragonés' comments on colonialism were an attempt "...to justify his offensive and disgraceful statement".

Death and legacy
Aragonés died on 1 February 2014 in Clínica CEMTRO hospital, Madrid, from leukemia.

The Royal Spanish Football Federation released a statement of "grief and shock" at the death of the man who was the coach at "the start of its most glorious era of successes on the world stage". Diego Simeone, incumbent manager of Atlético Madrid, spoke on the day of Aragonés' death, saying, "From here I want to send a very strong message to his family. Everyone at Atletico is hurting at the loss of such an important part of the club and for the Spanish football." Aragonés' successor as the coach of Spain national football team, Vicente Del Bosque gave his word, "We've woken up to a sad news. Luis has been the father of the successes for the National Team. We are in his hall and I think we will always carry him in our memory."

His funeral was held on 2 February in Madrid with the attendance including Spanish players Carles Puyol, Cesc Fàbregas, Andrés Iniesta and Xavi. He was buried in the cemetery of La Paz in Alcobendas.

At the 2014 UEFA Champions League Final, Atlético Madrid wore shirts with Aragonés' name written in gold on the inside of the collar.

Atlético Madrid pays tribute to Aragonés in the club membership cards for 2019–20 season.

References

External links

 
 
 National team data
 
 

1938 births
2014 deaths
Footballers from Madrid
Spanish footballers
Association football midfielders
Association football forwards
Getafe CF footballers
Real Madrid Castilla footballers
Recreativo de Huelva players
Hércules CF players
Real Oviedo players
Real Betis players
Atlético Madrid footballers
Tercera División players
Segunda División players
La Liga players
Spain international footballers
Spanish football managers
Atlético Madrid managers
Real Betis managers
FC Barcelona managers
RCD Espanyol managers
Sevilla FC managers
Valencia CF managers
Real Oviedo managers
RCD Mallorca managers
Spain national football team managers
Fenerbahçe football managers
La Liga managers
Segunda División managers
Süper Lig managers
2006 FIFA World Cup managers
UEFA Euro 2008 managers
UEFA European Championship-winning managers
Spanish expatriate football managers
Spanish expatriate sportspeople in Turkey
Expatriate football managers in Turkey
Deaths from cancer in Spain
Deaths from leukemia